SOS is the second studio album by American singer SZA. It was released through Top Dawg Entertainment and RCA Records on December 9, 2022. The album features guest appearances from Don Toliver, Phoebe Bridgers, Travis Scott, and the late Ol' Dirty Bastard. SZA worked with a variety of record producers and songwriters such as Babyface, Jeff Bhasker, Benny Blanco, Rodney Jerkins, DJ Dahi, Gabriel Hardeman, Ant Clemons and Lizzo. It serves as the follow-up to SZA's previous album Ctrl (2017).

The album was preceded by three singles—"Good Days", "I Hate U", and "Shirt". The first two peaked within the top ten of the Billboard Hot 100 alongside "Nobody Gets Me" and "Kill Bill", the fourth and fifth singles respectively. Upon release, SOS received widespread critical acclaim for its eclectic sound and SZA's vocal delivery, with several media publications ranking it as one of the best albums of 2022. 

The album debuted at number one on the Billboard 200—SZA's first to do so—and broke the record for the largest streaming week for an R&B album in the US. The album spent ten non-consecutive weeks atop the chart, making it the longest-running number-one female album of the decade and the first R&B album to spend its first seven weeks atop the chart since Whitney Houston's Whitney (1987). To promote the album, SZA is embarking on a North American arena tour, the SOS Tour, in early 2023.

Background and recording
SZA released her debut studio album, Ctrl, in 2017. Primarily an R&B album that deals with themes like heartbreak, Ctrl was widely acclaimed by critics for its vocal performances and eclectic musical style, as well as the relatability, emotional impact, and confessional nature of its songwriting. The album brought SZA to mainstream fame, and critics credit it with establishing her status as a major figure in contemporary pop and R&B music and pushing the boundaries of the R&B genre.

SZA alluded to potentially releasing her second album as early as August 2019 during an interview with DJ Kerwin Frost. Revealing planned collaborations with the likes of Justin Timberlake, Jack Antonoff, Brockhampton, and Post Malone, she said that the release date was "soon as fuck" and she might "start dropping loosies", though there was no explicit date announced. Four months prior, Punch, CEO of SZA's record label Top Dawg Entertainment, teased that he had begun overseeing ideas for the project. During the interview, SZA commented on the creative process behind the album and stated it would be as candid and personal as Ctrl: "This next album is even more of me being less afraid of who am I when I have no choice? When I'm not out trying to curate myself and contain."

In January 2020, SZA posted a status update about the album's completion online. When asked by a fan on Twitter whether new music was coming soon, she replied that she and Punch had been discussing a potential release date scheduled for 2020 and she felt anxious about the build-up to that day. The next month, an interview between her and Rolling Stone was published, in which she announced recent collaborations with American record producer Timbaland, as well as Australian singer-songwriter Sia with whom she wrote three songs. The interview also mentioned the status of the album's release date; SZA said "music is coming out for sure", but the caveat was the album itself was unlikely to be released within the year.

After fans grew impatient with the release delays, SZA responded by venting her frustrations on Twitter in August 2020. Alleging that the label was the reason for the postponement, she affirmed one fan's suspicion that she had been having hostile interactions with Top Dawg, and when someone showed her a post from Punch saying that the album would be released soon, SZA replied with "this is all he says to me as well. Welcome to my fucking life." In response, fans created the Twitter hashtag #FreeSZA in support of her struggles, and the trend went viral. However, she later retracted her claims by deleting the posts and said "don't nobody need to free me. Lmao I'm not being held hostage n neither is my music!! Sometimes u gotta be patient… sometimes no is a blessing… I trust the ppl around me." Vulture and Variety noted that Ctrl also suffered a similar problem with its release date; SZA quarrelled with Top Dawg executives over its two-year delay and threatened to quit music because of it.

When SZA collaborated with Cosmopolitan for their February 2021 issue, she talked about the emotions she expected to feel while making the album. She told the magazine, "this album is going to be the shit that made me feel something in my...here and in here", pointing to her heart and gut. From April to May 2022, SZA told media outlets that she had recently finished the album in Hawaii, describing it as her most relatable or "unisex" body of work she had made to date. During the Met Gala and an interview with Complex, SZA claimed that the album was ready for release during summertime in the United States ("this summer, it will be a SZA summer"), but there was no urgent deadline for the release.

The release date continued to be delayed, and SZA once more argued that Top Dawg and RCA were responsible for it; the album would, contractually, be her last to be released through the labels. In October, she said that she had written around 100 songs for the album and added that the album could be released "any day now". During a Billboard cover story published in November, SZA revealed the title of her second studio album was SOS, scheduled for release sometime next month. She expressed her frustration with complying with music industry standards on promoting music, saying she had been stressed with meeting her deadlines. On December 3, 2022, she appeared on Saturday Night Live and announced it would be released on December 9. Two days later, she posted the track list on Twitter.

Composition 
SOS is an album that blends R&B with hip hop and pop music. The album samples sound references from soul, gospel, jazz and melodic rap. The sound of the album was described as "a varied palette", combining "surf rock" and "grunge" elements, alongside "her beloved lo-fi beats". In Complex, she described the album's sound: "I have no idea what it sounds like to anybody else. I really don't know. It's so bizarre. It's weird that I can't put my finger on it. It's a little bit of everything." She added that some parts of the song had an "aggressive" sound whereas others were soft or balladic. During the Rolling Stone interview, she and Punch spoke in length about the album's composition. The inspiration in question was eclectic, drawing from jazz, alternative rock, "traditional" R&B, country, and hip hop. About the wide range of genres incorporated into the album, SZA said she did not care if her production choices made the album sound incohesive, because to her, "if you sound like you, your shit’s going to be cohesive. Period." Punch commented: "It's a new chapter. She's not scared to try certain things now."

Artwork 

On November 30, 2022, SZA posted the album cover on Instagram. She can be seen wearing a St. Louis Blues hockey jersey on the album cover. The cover is a reference to a 1997 photo of Diana, Princess of Wales, in a similar pose aboard a yacht during a trip in Portofino, Italy, surrounded by the Mediterranean Sea.

SZA reported on the decision to associate the cover and album with Princess Diana's photo: - Originally I was supposed to be on top of, like, a shipping barge," SZA said. "But in the references that I pulled for that, I pulled the Diana reference because I just loved how isolated she felt and that was what I wanted to convey the most. And then at the last minute, we, like, didn’t get clearance to get the shipping barges that we wanted and we were like, ‘We’re gonna build the diving board instead. We’re still gonna try it.’ We didn’t nix the boat altogether and we tried it and it turned out cool and I wasn’t sure it was going to be really cool until, like, right now. -

Promotion
SZA sporadically released music over a two-plus year period as she continued to perfect her album and push back on release dates. Releasing music videos for these singles, the second half of the video teasers for her next single would play at the end. At the end of a teaser video titled "PSA" released on her 33rd birthday, a message written in Morse code can be seen, which after being translated spells out "S.O.S.". In an interview with Billboard released on November 16, 2022, SZA confirmed the theories about the album title and release date in December 2022. She further admitted to feeling "stressed" about meeting the release deadline.

SZA promoted the album on the December 3, 2022, episode of NBC's Saturday Night Live as a musical guest. She performed live the single "Shirt" and the at-the-time unreleased track "Blind", which she previously teased. On December 5, she posted a snippet of a song titled "Nobody Gets Me". A few hours later, she posted the tracklist of the album on her Twitter. "Kill Bill" and "Nobody Gets Me" were promoted to US contemporary hit radio on January 10, 2023.

On December 13, 2022, SZA took to social media to announce merchandise for SOS, which included the St. Louis Blues jersey she wore in the cover art. At the same time, she revealed she would be touring North America in early 2023 in support of the album. She wrote on Instagram, "Time to take this shit on the road!" The SOS Tour consists of shows across 17 cities in Canada and the United States, and Omar Apollo was announced to be the opening act. The first show was on February 21, 2023, at the Schottestein Center in Columbus, Ohio; and the last is on March 23, 2023, at the Kia Forum in Inglewood, California. Tickets went on sale via SZA's website on December 16, 2022, at 12 pm Pacific Standard Time, with pre-sales hosted by Ticketmaster one day beforehand.

Critical reception

SOS has received widespread critical acclaim upon its release. At Metacritic, which assigns a normalized rating out of 100 based on reviews from critics, the album received a score of 90 out of 100, based on 20 reviews, indicating "universal acclaim".

Julianne Escobedo Shepherd of Pitchfork named the album "Best New Music", stressing how it "solidifies her position as a generational talent, an artist who translates her innermost feelings into indelible moments". Alexis Petridis of The Guardian wrote that the results of the album "are hugely eclectic", finding it "simultaneously impressive and a little exhausting". Petridis found that the songs "shine harder individually than taken in toto, where the sheer profusion causes them to merge into one, blended by a mood of stoned melancholy", with a final product of a "unwieldy" album, where SZA sounds as "a fabulous vocalist, powerful but unshowy, capable of shifting seamlessly into melodic rap".

NME's writer Rhian Daly reported that "under SZA’s command it feels cohesive, organic and like every skip into a new genre is completely justified for each track", pointing out that SOS is "a phenomenal record that barely puts a foot wrong and raises the bar even higher than she set it before". Cady Siregar by Consequence defined the album "an assured, ambitious, expansive, and genre-defying journey into the very depths of heartbreak and the many shades it comes in". The journalist emphasized that in Ctrl there is no predefined musical genre, because "the theme lies in her vocal prowess, the daringness of her vision, and her lyrical frankness".

Reviewing the album for AllMusic, Andy Kellman compared it favourably to SZA's previous album; "Hour-plus length and stylistic variety likewise signal that SOS could be the overreaching kind of highly anticipated follow-up. Still, it's an advancement from Ctrl in every respect apart from cohesion." Writing for Rolling Stone, Will Dukes also commented on the album's runtime; "SOS is very long – 23 tracks, well over an hour. It suggests someone continually adding to and augmenting a project, or perhaps throwing everything they’ve got at it, fuelled by the feeling that they might not do this again. The results are hugely eclectic."

Accolades
By the time SOS was released, many publications had already released their respective year-end best-of album lists. Nonetheless, some publications who released later lists included SOS.
{| class="wikitable sortable plainrowheaders"
|+SOS on year-end lists
! scope="col"| Publication
! scope="col" class="unsortable"| List
! scope="col" data-sort-type="number"| Rank
! scope="col" class="unsortable"| 
|-
! scope="row"| BPM
| ''BPMs Top 50 Albums of 2022
| 
| 
|-
! scope="row"| BrooklynVegan
| The 50 Best Albums of 2022
| 
| 
|-
! scope="row"| Consequence
| Top 50 Albums of 2022
| 
| 
|-
! scope="row"| Coup De Main Magazine
| The Best Albums of 2022
| 
| 
|-
! scope="row"| Variety
| The Best Albums of 2022
| 
| 
|-
! scope="row"| The Hollywood Reporter
| The 10 Best Albums of 2022
| 
| 
|}

 Commercial performance 
SOS debuted at number one on the US Billboard 200 chart, with 318,000 equivalent album units sold. The album earned 404.58 million on-demand official streams in its first week, breaking record for the biggest streaming week ever for an R&B album, and becoming the second-largest streaming week for an album by a female artist. Within days the album was certified gold by the Recording Industry Association of America (RIAA). Elsewhere, SOS entered within the top 5 of 10 countries: it debuted atop charts in Canada, Netherlands, and New Zealand; at number 2 in Australia (in which it peaked at number one in its seventh week), the UK, and Ireland; at number 3 in Norway and Denmark; and number 4 in Sweden and Switzerland.

Track listingNotes  signifies an additional producer.
  signifies a miscellaneous producer.
  signifies a vocal producer.
 "Ghost in the Machine" and "Far" feature additional vocals by Sadhguru.
 "Low" features additional vocals by Travis Scott.Sample credits "SOS" contains an interpolation of "Listen", performed by Beyoncé, and written by Beyoncé Knowles, Scott Cutler, Henry Krieger and Anne Preven; and a sample of "Until I Found the Lord (My Soul Couldn't Rest)", performed by the Gabriel Hardeman Delegation, and written by Gabriel Hardeman.
 "Love Language" contains an interpolation of "I Don't Wanna", and performed by Aaliyah, and written by Johntá Austin, Jazze Pha, Donnie Scantz and Kevin Hicks; and a sample of "Hit Different", performed by SZA featuring Ty Dolla Sign, and written by Solána Rowe, Tyrone Griffin, Jr., Pharrell Williams, Chad Hugo, and Rob Bisel.
 "Smoking on My Ex Pack" contains a sample of "Open Up Your Eyes", performed by Webster Lewis, and written by Clarence Scarborough.
 "Good Days" contains an interpolation of "In Too Deep", performed by Jacob Collier featuring Kiana Ledé and written by Collier.
 "Forgiveless" contains a sample of "Hidden Place", written and performed by Björk; and "The Stomp", written and performed by Ol' Dirty Bastard.

PersonnelMusicians SZA – lead vocals (all tracks), background vocals (tracks 14, 16, 20)
 Carter Lang – bass (2, 17), choir (2, 12), guitar (2, 13), keyboards (3, 6, 12, 13, 17), drums (12, 13), piano (12)
 Rob Bisel – bass (2, 17), choir (2, 12), guitar (2, 13), keyboards (3, 4, 6, 12, 13, 17), vocals (4), acoustic guitar (6); drums, piano (12); background vocals (14, 16, 20, 25)
 Teo Halm – keyboards, guitar, drums (20, 25)
 ThankGod4Cody – drums (3, 17), keyboards (3), choir (10)
 Scum – keyboards (3)
 Alessandro Buccellati – accordion, keyboards (4)
 Travis Scott – background vocals (4)
 Aire Atlantica – drums (4)
 Will Miller – keyboards (6)
 Yuli – viola (6)
 Granny – vocals (7, 20)
 Alexandria Arowora – choir (10)
 Anthony Johnson – choir (10)
 Charles Harmon – choir (10)
 Chelsea Miller – choir (10)
 Dylan Neustadter – choir (10)
 Erik Brooks – choir (10)
 Imani Carolyn – choir (10)
 Jewchelle Brown – choir (10)
 Joslynn James – choir (10)
 Roman Collins – choir (10)
 Storm Chapman – choir (10)
 Syd Tagle – choir (10)
 Stix – drums (10)
 Matt Cohn – drums (12)
 Sadhguru – vocals (12, 18)
 Lizzo – background vocals (13)
 Benny Blanco – background vocals, keyboards (16)
 Blake Slatkin – keyboards, guitar (16)
 Omer Fedi – keyboards (16)
 Sammy Witte – guitar (17)
 Still Woozy – guitar (17)
 Jacob Collier – background vocals (22)Technical'''

 Dale Becker – mastering (1–20, 22, 23, 25)
 Rob Bisel – mixing (1, 2, 6, 8, 12, 19–21), engineering (all tracks), mastering (21), vocal engineering (3, 17)
 Shawn Everett – mixing (1, 22), mastering (22)
 Jaycen Joshua – mixing (3, 17, 23)
 Derek "206derek" Anderson – mixing, engineering (4, 20)
 Jon Castelli – mixing (4, 7, 11, 15)
 Manny Marroquin – mixing (5, 18)
 Dana Nielsen – mixing (9, 10, 13)
 Şerban Ghenea – mixing (14, 16)
 Carson Graham – engineering (1, 5, 6, 8, 17, 18)
 Josh Deguzman – engineering (4, 7, 11, 15)
 Hector Castro – engineering (9, 15, 19, 21)
 Dylan Neustadter – engineering (10, 11, 16)
 Bryce Bordone – engineering (14, 16)
 Derek Keota – engineering (19, 23)
 Micah Petit – engineering (19, 23)
 Will Maclellan – vocal engineering (12)
 Katie Harvey – engineering assistance (1–20, 22, 23)
 Noah McCorkle – engineering assistance (1–20, 22, 23)
 Robert N. Johnson – engineering assistance (2, 4–6, 9, 12–15, 17–21)
 Syd Tagle – engineering assistance (2, 8, 10–12, 15–17)
 Trey Pearce – engineering assistance (2, 9, 17)
 Hayden Duncan – engineering assistance (3, 10, 12, 15, 16)
 DJ Riggins – engineering assistance (3, 17, 23)
 Jacob Richards – engineering assistance (3, 17, 23)
 Mike Seaberg – engineering assistance (3, 17, 23)
 Rachel Blum – engineering assistance (3, 17, 23)
 Ben Sedano – engineering assistance (5, 7, 19)
 Anthony Vilchis – engineering assistance (5, 18)
 Trey Station – engineering assistance (5, 18)
 Zach Pereyra – engineering assistance (5, 18)
 Jon Sher – engineering assistance (5)
 Kaushlesh Purohit – engineering assistance (7)
 Noah Hashimoto – engineering assistance (7, 13)
 Jonathan Lopez – engineering assistance (8, 14)
 Patrick Gardner – engineering assistance (14)
 Austin Christy – engineering assistance (15)
 Jeremy Dilli – engineering assistance (16, 18)
 Shelby Epstine – engineering assistance (20)
 Benny Blanco – programming (16)
 Blake Slatkin – programming (16)
 Omer Fedi – programming (16)
 Shellback – programming (16)

Charts

Certifications

Release history

See also 
 List of Billboard 200 number-one albums of 2022
 List of Billboard 200 number-one albums of 2023
 List of number-one albums of 2022 (Canada)
 List of number-one albums of 2023 (Canada)
 List of number-one albums from the 2020s (New Zealand)

Notes

References

2022 albums
RCA Records albums
SZA albums